Theodoric Valeton (born 1855 in Groningen - died 1929 in The Hague) was a Dutch botanist.

He studied at the University of Groningen and received his doctorate in 1886. In 1893, he began working at the botanical garden in Bogor, Indonesia and managed its herbarium between 1903 and 1913. Valeton studied Zingiberaceae in Bogor between 1916 and 1919.

He was honoured in the naming of 2 plant taxa; 
Valetonia  (in the Icacinaceae family), which was published in 1888, the name is now a synonym of Pleurisanthes 
In 1909, Franz Xaver Rudolf von Höhnel published Valetoniella , which is a genus of fungi (in the family Niessliaceae).

References

Dutch botanists
1855 births
1929 deaths